Sweden competed at the 1984 Summer Olympics in Los Angeles, California, United States. 174 competitors, 131 men and 43 women, took part in 138 events in 19 sports.

Medalists

Archery

Göran Bjerendal, a veteran of the 1980 Summer Olympics, became the second Swedish archer to place in the top eight and the first since 1972.

Women's Individual Competition:
 Liselotte Andersson – 2468 points (→ 14th place)
 Ylva Iversson – 2420 points (→ 26th place)

Men's Individual Competition:
 Göran Bjerendal – 2522 points (→ 6th place)
 Gert Bjerendal – 2481 points (→ 19th place)
 Tommy Quick – 2447 points (→ 27th place)

Athletics

Men's Competition
Men's 400 metres
Tommy Johansson
 Heat — 47.77 (→ did not advance)

Men's 5,000 metres 
Mats Erixon
 Heat — 13:44.45
 Semifinals — 13:29.72
 Final — 13:41.64 (→ 12th place)

Men's Marathon
 Tommy Persson — did not finish (→ no ranking)
 Kjell-Erik Ståhl — did not finish (→ no ranking)

Men's 50 km Walk
 Bo Gustafsson
 Final — 3:53:19 (→  Silver  Medal)

 Bengt Simonsen
 Final — DSQ (→ no ranking)

 Roland Nilsson
 Final — DSQ (→ no ranking)

Men's High Jump
 Patrik Sjöberg
 Qualification — 2.24m
 Final — 2.33m (→  Silver Medal)

 Thomas Eriksson
 Qualification — 2.21m (→ did not advance)

Men's Triple Jump
 Thomas Eriksson
 Qualification — 15.97m (→ did not advance)

Men's Javelin Throw 
 Kenth Eldebrink
 Qualification — 81.06m
 Final — 83.72m (→  Bronze Medal)

Men's Shot Put
 Sören Tallhem
 Qualifying Round — 19.94 m
 Final — 19.81 m (→ 7th place)

 Yngve Wahlander
 Qualifying Round — 18.28 m (→ did not advance)

Men's Discus Throw
 Stefan Fernholm
 Final — 63.22m (→ 8th place)

Men's Pole Vault
 Miro Zalar
 Qualifying Round — no mark (→ did not advance)

Women's Competition
Women's 1,500 metres 
 Jill McCabe
 Heat — 4:16.48 (→ did not advance)

Women's 3,000 metres 
 Eva Ernström
 Heat — 9.06.54 (→ did not advance)

Women's 400m Hurdles 
 Ann-Louise Skoglund
 Heat — 55.75
 Semifinal — 55.17
 Final — 55.43 (→ 5th place)

Women's Marathon 
 Midde Hamrin
 Final — 2:36:41 (→ 18th place)

Women's Long Jump
Annette Tånnander
 Qualification — 6.16 m (→ did not advance, 14th place)

Women's Heptathlon
 Kristine Tånnander
 Final Result — 5985 points (→ 12th place)

 Annette Tånnander
 Final Result — 5908 points (→ 14th place)

Boxing

Men's Lightweight
Shadrach Odhiambo

Men's Light-Welterweight
Stefan Sjöstrand

Men's Welterweight
Vesa Koskela

Men's Light-Middleweight
Lotfi Ayed

Men's Light-Heavyweight
Christer Corpi

Men's Heavyweight
Håkan Brock

Canoeing

Cycling

Eleven cyclists, seven men and four women, represented Sweden in 1984.

Men's individual road race
 Per Christiansson
 Lars Wahlqvist
 Kjell Nilsson
 Stefan Brykt

Team time trial
 Bengt Asplund
 Per Christiansson
 Magnus Knutsson
 Håkan Larsson

Women's individual road race
 Kristina Ranudd — 15th place
 Tuulikki Jahre — 16th place
 Marianne Berglund — 25th place
 Paula Westher — 35th place

Diving

Equestrianism

Fencing

Six fencers, five men and one woman, represented Sweden in 1984.

Men's épée
 Björne Väggö
 Jerri Bergström
 Greger Forslöw

Men's team épée
 Jerri Bergström, Greger Forslöw, Kent Hjerpe, Jonas Rosén, Björne Väggö

Women's foil
 Kerstin Palm

Gymnastics

Handball

Summary

Men's Team Competition
Preliminary Round (Group B)
Defeated South Korea (36:23)
Defeated United States (21:18)
Lost to West Germany (17:18)
Lost to Denmark (19:26)
Defeated Spain (26:25)
Classification Match
5th/6th place: Defeated Iceland (26:24) → 5th place

Team Roster
Göran Bengtsson
Per Carlsén
Lennart Ebbinge
Lars-Erik Hansson
Claes Hellgren
Rolf Hertzberg
Björn Jilsén
Per Jilsén
Mats Lindau
Christer Magnusson
Per Öberg
Peter Olofsson
Mats Olsson
Sten Sjögren
Danny Sjöberg-Augustsson

Judo

Modern pentathlon

Three male modern pentathletes represented Sweden in 1984. Svante Rasmuson won a silver medal in the individual event.

Individual
 Svante Rasmuson – 5456 points (→  Silver Medal)
 Martin Lamprecht – 4803 points (→ 30th place)
 Roderick Martin – 4205 points (→ 47th place)

Team
 Svante Rasmuson, Martin Lamprecht, Roderick Martin

Rhythmic gymnastics

Rowing

Sailing

Shooting

Swimming

Men's Competition
Men's 100m Freestyle 
Per Johansson
 Heat — 50.57
 Final — 50.31 (→  Bronze Medal)

Thomas Lejdström
 Heat — 51.19
 B-Final — 51.64 (→ 13th place)

Men's 200m Freestyle
Anders Holmertz
 Heat — 1:51.70
 B-Final — 1:52.44 (→ 12th place)

Thomas Lejdström
 Heat — 1:51.76
 B-Final — 1:53.63 (→ 16th place)

Men's 400m Freestyle
Anders Grillhammar
 Heat — 4:00.26 (→ did not advance, 21st place)

Anders Holmertz
 Heat — 4:03.07 (→ did not advance, 23rd place)

Men's 1500m Freestyle 
Anders Holmertz
 Heat — 16:11.38 (→ did not advance, 22nd place)

Men's 100m Backstroke 
Bengt Baron
 Heat — 57.66
 Final — 57.34 (→ 6th place)

Hans Fredin
 Heat — 58.39
 B-Final — 58.31 (→ 13th place)

Men's 200m Backstroke 
Michael Söderlund
 Heat — 2:05.85
 B-Final — 2:05.02 (→ 11th place)

Hans Fredin
 Heat — 2:06.50 (→ did not advance, 18th place)

Men's 100m Breaststroke
Peter Berggren
 Heat — 1:04.95
 B-Final — 1:05.66 (→ 16th place)

Men's 100m Butterfly
Bengt Baron
 Heat — 54.67
 Final — 55.14 (→ 8th place)

Men's 200m Butterfly
Thomas Lejdström
 Heat — 2:03.81 (→ did not advance, 20th place)

Men's 200m Individual Medley
Mikael Örn
 Heat — 2:07.56
 B-Final — 2:11.79 (→ 16th place)

Anders Peterson
 Heat — 2:08.35 (→ did not advance, 20th place)

Men's 400m Individual Medley
Anders Peterson
 Heat — 4:32.93
 B-Final — 4:27.95 (→ 9th place)

Men's 4 × 100 m Freestyle Relay 
Richard Milton, Michael Söderlund, Mikael Örn, and Per Johansson
 Heat — 3:23.86
Thomas Lejdström, Bengt Baron, Mikael Örn, and Per Johansson
 Final — 3:22.69 (→  Bronze Medal)

Men's 4 × 200 m Freestyle Relay 
Michael Söderlund, Tommy Werner, Mikael Örn, and Anders Holmertz
 Heat — 7:28.60
Michael Söderlund, Tommy Werner, Anders Holmertz, and Thomas Lejdström
 Final — 7:26.53 (→ 6th place)

Men's 4 × 100 m Medley Relay 
Michael Söderlund, Peter Berggren, Bengt Baron, and Per Johansson
 Heat — 3:49.76
Bengt Baron, Peter Berggren, Thomas Lejdström, and Per Johansson
 Final — 3:47.13 (→ 5th place)

Women's Competition
Women's 100m Freestyle 
Agneta Eriksson
 Heat — 58.43
 B-Final — 58.08 (→ 15th place)

Maria Kardum
 Heat — 58.22
 B-Final — 58.12 (→ 16th place)

Women's 200m Freestyle 
Ann Linder
 Heat — 2:04.60
 B-Final — 2:03.85 (→ 12th place)

Women's 200m Freestyle
Maria Kardum
 Heat — DNS (→ did not advance)

Women's 400m Freestyle 
Ann Linder
 Heat — 4:18.28
 B-Final — 4:17.55 (→ 11th place)

Women's 800m Freestyle 
Ann Linder
 Heat — 8:50.80 (→ did not advance, 9th place)

Women's 4 × 100 m Freestyle Relay 
Maria Kardum, Agneta Eriksson, Petra Hilder, and Malin Rundgren
 Heat — 3:52.27
Maria Kardum, Agneta Eriksson, Petra Hilder, and Karin Furuhed
 Final — 3:51.24 (→ 7th place)

Women's 4 × 100 m Medley Relay
Anna-Karin Eriksson, Eva-Marie Håkansson, Agneta Eriksson, and Maria Kardum
 Heat — 4:17.65
 Final — DSQ (→ no ranking)

Women's 100m Backstroke
Anna-Karin Eriksson
 Heat — 1:06.09 (→ did not advance, 20th place)

Women's 200m Backstroke
Sofia Kraft
 Heat — 2:19.73
 B-Final — 2:19.37 (→ 15th place)

Women's 200m Individual Medley
Anette Philipsson
 Heat — 2:21.70
 B-Final — 2:21.54 (→ 12th place)

Maria Kardum
 Heat — 2:22.87 (→ did not advance, 18th place)

Women's 400m Individual Medley
Sofia Kraft
 Heat — 4:55.10
 B-Final — 4:53.25 (→ 10th place)

Weightlifting

Wrestling

References

Nations at the 1984 Summer Olympics
1984
Summer Olympics